Starshatter is an independently developed space flight simulator by American developer Destroyer Studios. It is published by Matrix Games. In October 2006, a sequel, Starshatter: The Gathering Storm was released.

References

External links
Matrix Games homepage
French Starshatter Team website
Starshatter Open Source Project Board (HLP)

2004 video games
Space combat simulators
Video games developed in the United States
Windows games
Windows-only games
Matrix Games games
Single-player video games